This is a list of musical bands from the region of Goa, which is a prominent musical center in South Asia. In music, a musical ensemble or band is a group of musicians that works together to perform music.

Goa, which sits on the Arabian Sea in southwest India and is the nation's smallest state, was a territory of Portugal from 1510 to 1961. While its official language is the Konkani language, until 1961, most Goans were educated in Portuguese. Today, many Goans are Catholic, speak Portuguese and have Portuguese names. Between the Portuguese colonization and the 19th century influx of the British and other westerners, Goa was the most westernized area of India. It is where western music took root and most of India's jazz musicians came from Goa.

Aparupa Mazumder has written that, in 1934, "Goan musicians formed the Bombay Symphony and in 1947, they formed the Bombay Madrigal Singers Organization". She also notes that Goa has "given birth to famous artists" like Chris Perry, Chic Chocolate and Lorna "though many got their break in Mumbai".

Brass bands have also been popular in the region but are now dying out.

Following is a list of bands, compiled from various sources, some print and also online, such as the WhatsApp-based Bands in Goa groups which as of September 2020 link around 200+ musicians connected to Goa

Brass band
 Don Bosco's, Panjim, had school brass band from 1968 onwards, from memory, trained and conducted by Mestre Santana Cota of Mercês.  Among the players, Darryl Figueiredo played the trumpet and Ian Figueiredo (then a student) played the saxophone.
 Ultra Brass Sound (Rui Lobo)
 The Rubber Band, headed by A D Deniz, active around 2011.
 Manovikas High School Brass Band

Christian band
 Band of Priests 
 Faith, Margao-based band
 Olavo Rodrigues, Konkani Gospel
 Shepherd's Voice

Choir 
 All For Jesus
 Celebration, Since 1991
 Divind Harmony Choral Ensemble
 Goa University Choir, founded in August 2013
 Goencho Nad directed by Fr. Camilo Xavier.
 Harmonics-Chandorchim Motiam
 Harmonizers, led by Alvaro Pereira (Utorda)
 Heavenly Voices Choir
 Holy Spirit Choir
 Our Lady of Lourdes Choir
 Sanctus
 Santa Cecilia Choir
 Santa Cruz parish choir. Led by José Santana Cota.  Feasts, weddings, funerals
 Seraphic Voices
 St Elizabeth Choir Ucassiam
 God's Love In Harmony, Porvorim

Cover band
 A26
 Alcatrazz
 Aqua Strings (Panjim)
 Aquatech
 Archies Band (Verna)
 Artwork
 Audacity (Margao)
 Aztecs
 Band Ambassadors
 * Beat 4 (1960s and 1970s) Beat 4 was led by Remo Fdes, composed of late Alexandre do Rosario, late Caetano Abreau, tony Godinho/Steve Sequeira. Their rivals were Bethovens and later on Brood of Vipers, Scorpions of Africa, etc.  for the annual Simla Beat Contest qualifiers.
 Beatovens from South Goa.  Dr. Roy Sales Andrade from Margao (now in Brazil) led the band.  Among others were late Nobby Noronha from Seraulim and Chris Dias from Navelim.
 Bees
 Big Country Band (Panjim)
 Billy Rangers
 Billy n De Kids
 Black IN White
 Black Slade
 Bliss
 Blue Note Trio (with George Fernandes, pianist)
 Blue Orange
 Blue Turtle
 Blue Waves
 Boyfriends
 Brood of Vipers
 Brothers in Arms (Taleigao)
 Cascades (Caranzalem)
 Chocolate Highway
 Civilians
 Climax
 Cloudburst
 Cream
 Crusaders
 Crimson Tide (Panjim)
 Crossroads.  1991 to 2001.  Margao.  Winners of the Kala Academy All Goa Pop, Rock and Jazz contest first prize in 1993.
 Cyclones
 Deep Red
 Diamonds
 Ebony
 Ecstacy
 Electric Fire (Aldona – Cyril, Elen, Cosme Fernandes), 1989–1994. Performed at FABR and THV (Sinquerim), Colonia Santa Maria (Baga), weddings.
 Emiliano and The Gay Caballeros
 Entertainers, at FABR in 1990
 Excellence
 Fantasy
 Footprints. Aldona. Started in 2019. Marino de Souza and team.
 Forefront (Chapora)
 Funk 49
 Genesis
 Goa Amigos (Dona Paula)
 Gold Dust
 Harmony
 Headlines
 Hard Rock
 Heaven 7
 Heritage Jazz (Campal)
 Horizon (Loutolim)
 Human Touch (South Goa)
 Imagination
 Impact
 India (Goa Velha)
 Indiana with Remo, Bondo, Lala and Abel
 Jazz 5, Carlos Monteiro's band (with Avelino, Douglas, Anthony, Caji, Crispin, Tino, Ivo
 Jazz Junction
 Jazz Messengers
 Jazz Quartet
 Karma
 L'ace (Panjim)
 La Scala
 Legends
 Les Vandals
 Luis & His Melodians
 Lynx (see Link below)
 Limits
 Link (formed by Xisto, Georgie, Ponos. Agusto joined later. There was another bass player before Agusto. Terry was the additional fifth member who joined them just one year before the Oberoi contract.  In 1981 Darryl Rodrigues joined the Link and in 1983 Bangdo joined.  In 1989, Conny and Miller joined them at Oberoi's after Bangdo and Darryl left.  Later Conny, Agusto and Terry formed Lynx with James Rebello and Jude Vaz.  Xisto carried on with the Link at Oberoi's.  We still have the Lynx uptil now, Sept 2020. The Band of the Sand with Sandy on the lead vocals.)
 Magnum Opus (with Black Michael)
 Manpower
 Men Machine
 Moderates
 Modulators (Led by Babush)
 Microwave Papudums
 Music Company
 Muzik Mann
 New Generation
 New Human Touch, 1986–90
 Nexus
 NH17 
 Obligato
 Obsession
 Oramins & Orabeats were Don Bosco Oratory Panjim bands started by Fr. Edward.  Oramins had Bondo on drums, Abel on Bass, Darryl Figueredo on Rhythm guitar, Zito Menezes on Lead guitar and Henry Pinheiro on vocals.
 Pirates
 Phoenix 
 Pure Magic
 Purple Rain (Ribandar)
 Raagas to Riches
 Radio Serenaders, possibly mid-1950s till 1970s.
 Rainstorm with Diana
 Remo & Bondo
 Ringers, 1950s–1970s, played for weddings, Colva and Margao clubs and radio Emissora de Goa, Carnival, serenading, cabaret dances.  Led by Emercio Rodrigues (guitar, violin, vocals) with members Stephen Dias (Bass on rabeca), Crescencio Dourado (mandolin), Luis Joao Rodrigues (gumott, violin, guitar, vocals) and Domingos (guitar). Played Portuguese, Konkani songs, mandos, Spanish, Brazilian numbers, and a few Hindi songs. 
 Rocking Beats
 Rolling Beats
 Rome of the East
 Ronnie M in Bombay in the 1980s led by Ronnie Monserrate
 Royal Symphony, Varca, with Dominic
 Rhythm and Blues
 Seby N The Wings
 Shades (Curtorim)
 Santimano Family Band.  Parents and eight children. Performed at Panjim gardens, mando festival, Clube Nacional and Clube Vasco da Gama.
 Silk Route
 Silver Lining
 Silver Strings, Margao-based early 1990s
 Silvia and the Beat Route Jam
 Simplicity
 Sixth Sense
 Sky
 Sky High
 Smooth
 Sonia and Fausta
 Sparks
 Spiders
 Square Heads
 Status 4
 Sting (also called The Sting, with August, Alex, Savio, Donny—later Darryl R.)
 Strangers
 Surya, fusion band, at FABR
 Taan-Trikz
 Tidal Wave
 The Aryans
 The Band
 The Bassman's Band
 The Big City Band
 The Big Country Band
 The Bliss
 The Brood of Vipers
 The Clique
 The Coffee Cats
 The Comets
 The Cream
 The Crest 
 The Darts
 The Diamonds
 The Drifters (Errol) Chris Perry's son formed this around 1995 with the Silva Sisters
 The Earth Stage (Fusion) Elvin, Rumian and Cosme Fernandes
 The Forefront
 The Foremost
 The Greensleeves, 1970s
 The Hijackers
 The Jazz Messengers
 The Legends (Saligao)
 The Limits
 The Music Company
 The Musicians
 The New Faces
 The News
 The Oromines
 The Squad
 The Symphony
 The Syndicate
 The Voices
 The Renegades
 The Revelation
 The Trix
 The Usual Suspects
 The Valadares Sisters (Ruth, Jacinta, Lucia)
 Tidal Wave
 Tomorrow's People
 Triad
 True Blue
 Typhonns
 Symphony
 The Hijackers
 The Lynx (Chicalim)
 Under The Bridge
 Unfair Dead
 V4
 Vagabonds Cry
 Valentinos
 Vampires
 Ventures
 Victor Shreeves' band
 Vultures, around 1974–76.

Girl group
 Casual Encounters, mainly from Moira, circa 1990s.
 Poison Ivy, circa 1990s.

Jazz band
 Blues Power
 Goa Grooves
 Lounge Jazz
 Jazz Goa Trio
 Smoking Chutney
 Latin Connection
 The Bassman's Band
 The Brown Indian Band
 The Suburban Jazz Ensemble

One-Man and Duo Bands
 Bondo
 Chico Fonseca (Portuguese, Konkani, etc)
 Crossroads
 Danny One Man Band https://weddingsdegoa.com/wdglisting/danny-one-man-band/
 Elvis One Man Band
 Valentinos (duo band), founded in 2000 by Elv
is and Edgar DeSouza, Ribandar.
Jukebox Duo (Tania and Andre)

Orchestra
 Goa Choral Symphony
 Goa State Symphony Orchestra
 Orquestra Sinfónica de Goa (Goa Symphony Orchestra), first orchestra to be launched in 1952 under the baton of Maestro António Fortunato de Figueiredo.
 Panjim Open Philharmonic
 The Goa Strings Orchestra

Early-to-mid 20th century Goan bands
Following bands were known in the past, but are no longer extant.
 Johnson and His Jolly Boys, from Siolim, prominent all over Goa. Also known as Orquestra Johnson de Siolim and Joãozinho e o seu Conjunto Alegre.
 The Miranda Brothers of Loutulim, charmed audiences in Pangim.
 Mestre Pedro Fernandes of Ilhas (Tiswaddi), sought after band from 1928.
 Mestre Caetano Varela Caiado from Merces conducted Banda Municipal de Pangim.
 Mestre José Santana Cota, from Santa Cruz.
 Mestre Sebasteão Cota, from Pangim.
 Mestre Paulo Dias from Divar nicknamed the Lotachem Band.
 Mestre Manuelinho Menezes, from Divar, and the Danddeachem Band.
 Merry Makers, Saligao
 Ignatius and his Swinging Boys
 Joe and his Havana Boys
 John Moonlight
 Jolly Brothers of Andrew
 Cuban Boys Serenate

Goan bands outside Goa
 AudioCITY (Dubai), July 2019 till mid-2020. First line up: Blythe Rodrigues vocals, guitar. Denzil: vocals keyboards. Anselm: drums. Ryan Simoes: vocals, bass. Rodney: vocals, lead guitar. Second line up: Anselm Noronha on drums; Ryan Simoes on Bass; Denzil on keyboards; Shane on vocals, rhythm; Rodney Vaz on lead guitar. All in Dubai
 Top Ranks (Goan Band in Kuwait)
 Stepping Stones (Goan Band in Kuwait)
 Goans may have had an influence, and indeed a band or two, in Kuala Lumpur, Malaysia.  A Gomes (perhaps the father of Prof.  Alberto Gomes) was a pianist there.  Theresinha Gonsalves from my neighbourhood was a pianist in Malaysia for many years.
 Canadian rock band Billy Talent has Ian D'Sa as its lead guitarist. The band from Mississauga, Ontario was formed in 1993 and formerly called Pezz. Billy Talent has sold over 900,000 physical albums in Canada alone and nearly 3 million albums internationally. It was among the top 10 best-selling Canadian bands in Canada.
 Bombay Music Lovers

Miscellaneous music initiatives
 Music Circle

References

Lists of bands